Avándaro Golf Club is a golf course located in the Valle de Bravo state of Mexico.

During the 1968 Games, the club had stables for 120 horses to have the event on the course and the neighboring countryside.

References
1968 Summer Olympics official report. Volume 2. Part 1. p. 77. 
Golftoday.co.uk profile.
Official website 

1959 establishments in Mexico
Golf clubs and courses in Mexico
History of the State of Mexico
Olympic equestrian venues
Sports venues in the State of Mexico
Sports venues completed in 1959
Valle de Bravo
Venues of the 1968 Summer Olympics